Syed Tajammul Hussain (PP) (January 1, 1951 – July 28, 2013), was a prominent Pakistani chemist and physicist, one of the pioneers of nano-technology in the country, known for his important contributions to the field of nanomaterial-based catalysts. He is also known for his role in laying down the foundations of nanotechnology in Pakistan and a new method for production of diesel fuel from coal, catalyzed by nano-particles.

Biography

Hussain was born in Multan in 1951 to Mr Aijaz Ali and Mrs. Bilquis. He did his early schooling and undergraduate education from Islamabad in chemistry. Followed by his education in Pakistan, he proceeded overseas to the world-renowned hub of material science, the UMIST (University of Manchester Institute of Science and Technology) for his post-graduate education, successfully completing MS and PhD in 1988 and 1991, respectively from the Center for Surface and Material Analysis (CSMA) at UMIST. Followed by his post-doctoral training at UMIST, he spent several years working with commercial organizations in Canada, Italy and Saudi Arabia, contributing and gaining valuable expertise in nanoscience and catalyst research. He joined the Abdus Salam National Center for Physics Nano Science and Catalysis Division in 2005 as a faculty member and was its director and professor till his untimely death in 2013. He also held an appointment as Visiting Professor with the Chemistry Department, Quaid-e-Azam University.

Among other attachments, he held several visiting scientist/fellow positions with organizations, including the Advanced Light Source at University of California Berkeley, the UMIST Surface Science and Catalyst Research Center, Manchester, Center for Applied Catalyst Research, University of Laval, Canada, the National Center for Upgrading Technology (NCUT), Alberta, Canada, and SABIC (Saudi Arabia Basic Industries, Corporation), Saudi-Arabia.

He is mainly credited for his work on nano-catalytic dewaxing of heavy petroleum wastes, a method of manufacture of silver oxide nano particles, a nano-catalyst for fast track bio-diesel production from non-edible oils and Novel method of manufacture of silver oxide nano particles, holding patents for all these new methods. He authored a number of important and highly cited publications in renowned journals of chemistry, some of which can be found here, etc. Other than professional publications, he also wrote an A-Level Chemistry book for intermediate students in Pakistan.

Hussain died on 28 July 2013. 

The Pakistan Society for Computational Science/Biology (PSCS/PSCB) organized a special memorial conference in his honor in 2014, since he was an active supporter of Bioinformatics in Pakistan.

Fellowships
As enumerated in his biography at the NCP site, he was:
 Fellow and Chartered Chemist, Royal Chemical Society, UK
 Fellow American Chemical Society, USA
 Fellow North American Catalyst Society, Canada
 Fellow Chemical Society of Pakistan, Pakistan

Awards
 Pride of Performance (2022)

References

Pakistani scientists
Pakistani chemists
1954 births
2013 deaths
Pakistani physicists
Academic staff of Quaid-i-Azam University